Sokratis Petrou (born 8 May 1979) is a Greek footballer who plays for A.O Loutraki as a midfielder .

Career
Petrou began playing football as a defensive midfielder for Aiolikos F.C. in the Gamma Ethniki. In 1999, he signed with Skoda Xanthi F.C., where he would make 38 Alpha Ethniki appearances in seven seasons with the club. Xanthi sent him on loan to Beta Ethniki sides Egaleo F.C. and Niki Volos F.C. as well as Cypriot Second Division club AEP Paphos F.C., as he never became a first-team regular.

After being released by Xanthi, Petrou joined newly promoted Cypriot First Division side Ayia Napa F.C. for six months. He returned to Greece to play for Agrotikos Asteras F.C. in the second half of the 2006–07 Beta Ethniki season. Next, he dropped down to the Delta Ethniki to play two seasons with Olympiakos Loutraki.

Petrou returned to the Gamma Ethniki with Agia Paraskevi F.C. in July 2009.
He also played for Rouf, Vyzas and Paniliakos F.C.

References

External links
Myplayer Profile
Profile at Onsports.gr
Profile at EPAE.org

1979 births
Living people
Greek footballers
Greece under-21 international footballers
Greek expatriate footballers
Aiolikos F.C. players
Xanthi F.C. players
Egaleo F.C. players
Niki Volos F.C. players
Vyzas F.C. players
Paniliakos F.C. players
AEP Paphos FC players
Ayia Napa FC players
Super League Greece players
Football League (Greece) players
Cypriot First Division players
Cypriot Second Division players
Expatriate footballers in Cyprus
Association football midfielders
People from Corinthia
Footballers from the Peloponnese